Camilla Kerslake is a 2009 album by the classical crossover artist Camilla Kerslake, released on 23 November 2009 in the UK.

Track listing
 "She Moved Through the Fair"
 "How Can I Keep From Singing?"
 "I Can't Help Falling in Love"
 "Rule the World (Il Mondo é Nostro)"
 "Rain"
 "Balulalow"
 "Pie Jesu"
 "Panis angelicus"
 "Closest Thing to Crazy"
 "Cavatina"
 "In Paradisum"
 "Largo"
Bonus CD
 "Silent Night"
 "In the Bleak Midwinter"
 "The First Noel"
 "Abide With Me"
 "White Christmas"

References

2009 albums